The 6th Bodil Awards was held in 1953 in Copenhagen, Denmark, honouring the best in Danish and foreign film of 1952.

Erik Balling received his first Bodil Award for Best Danish Film for his début film Adam and Eve.

Foreign films were represented with Alf Sjöberg's Only a Mother winning the Bodil Award for Best European Film, and Fred Zinnemann's High Noon winning the award for Best American Film.

Winners

Best Danish Film 
 Adam and Eve directed by Erik Balling

Best Actor in a Leading Role 
 Per Buckhøj in Adam and Eve

Best Actress in a Leading Role 
 Not awarded

Best Actor in a Supporting Role 
 Not awarded

Best Actress in a Supporting Role 
 Not awarded

Best European Film 
 Only a Mother directed by Alf Sjöberg

Best American Film 
 High Noon directed by Fred Zinnemann

Recipients

Honorary Award 
 Cinematographer Kjeld Arnholtz for shooting  (1953)

Notes

References

External links 
 6th Bodil Awards at the official Bodil Awards website

1952 film awards
1953 in Denmark
Bodil Awards ceremonies
1950s in Copenhagen